Route 330, also known as Road to the Shore or more commonly Gander Bay Road, is a highway that extends from Gander, Newfoundland across "the loop" (as locals call it) passing through towns such as Gander Bay South, Carmanville, Musgrave Harbour, and Lumsden  to New-Wes-Valley. Here, the highway connects with Route 320, which continues "the loop" down the west shore of Bonavista Bay exiting back to the Trans-Canada Highway (Route 1) in Gambo.

Route description

Route 330 begins in Gander at an intersection with Route 1 (Trans-Canada Highway). It immediately heads north through a business district and neighbourhoods that are sandwiched between downtown to the west and the Gander International Airport to the east. The highway passes through more neighbourhoods before leaving Gander and heading up the rural Gander River Valley, where it passes by Jonathan's Pond Campground. Route 330 now follows the coastline of Gander Bay as it passes through the town of Gander Bay South, where it has an intersection with Route 331 (Boyd's Cove Highway), before it begins passing through the Straight Shore area of Newfoundland as it has a couple of intersections with Route 332 (Frederickton Road), one at Main Point, and the other at Carmanville. Route 330 passes east through inland areas for several kilometres, where it meets a local road leading to Aspen Cove and Ladle Cove, to pass through Musgrave Harbour. The highway now turns southeast along the coastline to pass by Banting Memorial Municipal Park before passing through Deadman's Bay and Lumsden. Route 330 meets a local road leading to Cape Freels, along with the community of the same name, before entering the New-Wes-Valley town limits and passing through Templeman, where it meets a local road to Newtown. Route 330 now enters Pound Cove and comes to an end shortly thereafter at an intersection between Route 320 (Road to the Shore) and a local road to Wesleyville.

Major intersections

See also

List of Newfoundland and Labrador highways

References

330